Chikkanayakanahalli Puttegowda Krishnakumar (born 8 April 1939), commonly known as C. P. Krishnakumar or CPK, is an Indian academic, writer, poet, folklorist, critic and translator in Kannada. CPK has published more than 100 literary works in different genres including poetry, criticism, translation. He was the president at the 78th Kannada Sahitya Sammelana held in Gangavati in 2011.

Early life
Krishnakumar was born on 8 April 1939 in Chikkanayakanahalli, a village in Mysore to Puttegowda and Chikkamma.

Career
As academic
CPK served as professor in Mysore University and became the director of the Institution for Kannada Studies.
As writer
CPK is known for his wide range of literary works from poems to translation. His poem collections including Oladani, Nimage Nive Dikku based on the subjects of human relations and social conditions. 

CPK is a noted translator for his translation works from Kannada to other languages such as Sanskrit and English and vice versa.

Literary works 
Poetry 
 Thaarasakha
 Oladani
 Anatha-Prithvi
 Hanimini 
 Bogase 
 Antharathama (vachana)

Essay
 Chintanabindu
 Meluku

Criticism & Research
 Adhyayana
 Aalochana
 Upachaya
 Kavyatathva: Kelavu Mukhagalu 
 Kumaravyasa virachita: Gadugina Bhaaratha

Folklore
 Janapada Sahitya Praveshika
 Jaanapada Saraswathi

Edition
 Aayda Kuvempu Kavanagalu
 Kattimani: Baduku-Baraha

Accolades
 2010 - Nrupatunga Award
 Dakshina Kesari Award - for his work "Chintana Chintamani"
 1996 - Karnataka Rajyotsava Award by Government of Karnataka

See also
 Javaregowda
 K. S. Bhagawan
 C. P. Siddhashrama
 Vijaya Dabbe
 R. Indira

References

Kannada-language writers
Kannada poets
People from Mysore district
1939 births
Living people